John Karkazis, better known as Johnny K, is an American record producer, engineer, mixer, musician, and songwriter. He owns Groovemaster Recording Studios in Chicago. In addition to the studios, his  music complex includes a gymnasium, rehearsal rooms, and pre-production rooms.

Album credits

References

External links 
 The BK Entertainment Group
 Groovemaster Studio

Living people
Musicians from Chicago
Record producers from Illinois
Songwriters from Illinois
Year of birth missing (living people)